Tsentralny District is the name of several administrative and municipal divisions in Russia. The name literally means "Central".

Federal districts and economic regions
Central Federal District (Tsentralny federalny okrug), a federal district
Central economic region (Tsentralny ekonomichesky rayon), an economic region

Districts of the federal subjects
Tsentralny District, Saint Petersburg, an administrative district of the federal city of Saint Petersburg

City divisions
Tsentralny City District, Barnaul, a city district of Barnaul, the administrative center of Altai Krai
Tsentralny City District, Bratsk, a city district of Bratsk, a city in Irkutsk Oblast
Tsentralny City District, Chelyabinsk, an administrative and municipal city district of Chelyabinsk, the administrative center of Chelyabinsk Oblast
Tsentralny Administrative District, Chita, an administrative district of the city of Chita, the administrative center of Zabaykalsky Krai
Tsentralny Administrative District, Kaliningrad, an administrative district of the city of Kaliningrad, the administrative center of Kaliningrad Oblast
Tsentralny City District, Kemerovo, a city district of Kemerovo, the administrative center of Kemerovo Oblast
Tsentralny City District, Khabarovsk, a city district of Khabarovsk, the administrative center of Khabarovsk Krai
Tsentralny City District, Kostroma, a city district of Kostroma, the administrative center of Kostroma Oblast
Tsentralny Okrug, Krasnodar, an okrug of the city of Krasnodar, the administrative center of Krasnodar Krai
Tsentralny City District, Krasnoyarsk, a city district of Krasnoyarsk, the administrative center of Krasnoyarsk Krai
Tsentralny Okrug, Kursk, an okrug of the city of Kursk, the administrative center of Kursk Oblast
Tsentralny Okrug, Nazran, an okrug of the city of Nazran, a city in the Republic of Ingushetia
Tsentralny City District, Norilsk, a city district of Norilsk, a city in Krasnoyarsk Krai
Tsentralny City District, Novokuznetsk, a city district of Novokuznetsk, a city in Kemerovo Oblast
Tsentralny City District, Novorossiysk, a city district of Novorossiysk, a city in Krasnodar Krai
Tsentralny City District, Novosibirsk, a city district of Novosibirsk, the administrative center of Novosibirsk Oblast
Tsentralny Administrative Okrug, Omsk, an administrative okrug of the city of Omsk, the administrative center of Omsk Oblast
Tsentralny City District, Orenburg, a city district of Orenburg, the administrative center of Orenburg Oblast
Tsentralny City District, Prokopyevsk, a city district of Prokopyevsk, a city in Kemerovo Oblast
Tsentralny City District, Sochi, a city district of Sochi, a city in Krasnodar Krai
Tsentralny City District, Tolyatti, a city district of Tolyatti, a city in Samara Oblast
Tsentralny City District, Tula, a city district of Tula, the administrative center of Tula Oblast
Tsentralny City District, Tver, a city district of Tver, the administrative center of Tver Oblast
Tsentralny Administrative Okrug, Tyumen, an administrative okrug of the city of Tyumen, the administrative center of Tyumen Oblast
Tsentralny City District, Volgograd, a city district of Volgograd, the administrative center of Volgograd Oblast
Tsentralny City District, Voronezh, a city district of Voronezh, the administrative center of Voronezh Oblast

See also
Tsentralny (disambiguation)
Tsentralny Okrug (disambiguation)

References